
Gmina Gniewkowo is an urban-rural gmina (administrative district) in Inowrocław County, Kuyavian-Pomeranian Voivodeship, in north-central Poland.

Villages
Apart from the town of Gniewkowo, Gmina Gniewkowo contains the villages and settlements of Bąbolin, Branno, Buczkowo, Chrząstowo, Dąblin, Gąski, Godzięba, Kaczkowo, Kawęczyn, Kępa Kujawska, Kijewo, Klepary, Lipie, Markowo, Murzynko, Murzynno, Ostrowo and Warzyn.

Neighbouring gminas
Gmina Gniewkowo is bordered by the gminas of Aleksandrów Kujawski, Dąbrowa Biskupia, Inowrocław, Rojewo and Wielka Nieszawka.

References
Polish official population figures 2006

Gniewkowo
Inowrocław County